Elias Friedman OCD (1916–1999), was a Carmelite priest.

Biography

Born in 1916 into a family of Jewish origin in South Africa, and was given the name Jacob Friedman, although he was known as Jackie to his family and friends. He graduated from the University of Cape Town in 1938. In 1943, while serving as a doctor in the South African Medical Brigade, joined the Catholic Church. Four years later, he became a Discalced Carmelite and produced his first book, "The Redemption of Israel" published by Sheed and Ward. Friedman was ordained in 1953 and entered the Stella Maris monastery a year later. Friedman lived in the monastery Stella Maris of Mount Carmel in Haifa, Israel, until his death in 1999.

Academic and religious life

Friedman earned several awards as an author, historian of the origins of the Carmelites, linguist, translator, public speaker, internationally acclaimed musician, and poet. The book "Jewish Identity" was the result of long years of prayer, study and over 40 years of religious life in Israel. The new organization he founded, the Association of Hebrew Catholics, is an early manifestation of the insights contained in this work. Alongside the Catholic Church, with the Second Vatican Council, has been reviewing its teachings about Jews and Judaism.

References
Friedman, J. (1947) The Redemption of Israel. Sheed & Ward, London. 
Friedman, E. (1987) Jewish Identity. The Miriam Press. New York.

External links
 http://www.hebrewcatholic.org
 http://www.catholic.co.il/

Israeli Christian clergy
Converts to Roman Catholicism from Judaism
Israeli Roman Catholics
South African emigrants to Israel
South African people of Jewish descent
1916 births
1999 deaths
Discalced Carmelites